Wertz–Bestle Farm is a historic home and farm located in German Township, St. Joseph County, Indiana.  The house was built about 1872, and is a two-story, "T"-plan, Italianate style brick dwelling with a -story kitchen wing. It sits on a fieldstone foundation and has bracketed eaves and segmental arched windows.  Also on the property is the contributing -story, two-level, Schweitzer barn.

It was listed on the National Register of Historic Places in 2001.

References 

Farms on the National Register of Historic Places in Indiana
Italianate architecture in Indiana
Houses completed in 1872
Buildings and structures in St. Joseph County, Indiana
National Register of Historic Places in St. Joseph County, Indiana